Jacqueline Jones (born 17 June 1948) is an American social historian. She held the Walter Prescott Webb Chair in History and Ideas from 2008 to 2017 and is Mastin Gentry White Professor of Southern History at the University of Texas at Austin. Her expertise is in American social history in addition to writing on economics (including feminist economics), race, slavery, and class. She is a Macarthur Fellow, Bancroft Prize Winner, and has been a finalist for the Pulitzer Prize twice.

Background 
Jones was born in Delaware. Jones' mother taught at Delaware Technical and Community College. Her father, Albert P. Jones (died 1995), worked for DuPont and was the president of the Delaware State Board of Education for many years; she attended an elementary school in Christiana, Delaware named after him in 1996. Jones received a B.A. in 1970 from the University of Delaware, and a Ph.D. in 1976 from the University of Wisconsin–Madison. She has held academic positions at Wellesley College, Brown University and Brandeis University. In July 1999 Jones was awarded a MacArthur Fellowship. Although the award typically allows academics to take time off from their teaching, she decided to wait before beginning her research and worked through the period of the fellowship, saying, "I think I will take time off in a few years, but I really like being here on campus, being around my colleagues, teaching." Jones has also been awarded a Ford Fellowship, a Woodrow Wilson Fellowship, and an American Council of Learned Societies Fellowship, and was twice a finalist for the Pulitzer Prize in history. She is married to the political scientist and law professor Jeffrey Abramson, author of We, The Jury and Minerva's Owl, among other texts. The couple has two daughters, Sarah Jones Abramson and Anna Jones Abramson.

Ideas and awards 
In 1986, Jones's second book Labor of Love, Labor of Sorrow: Black Women, Work, and the Family from Slavery to the Present won her the Bancroft Prize. In Labor of Love, Labor of Sorrow, Jones demonstrates her extensive knowledge of the history of the South from 1830 to 1915. The book begins as a study of African Americans and the hardships they faced during the nineteenth century, but then develops to include commentary on the impact of class and gender on women in the South. The book goes on to debunk ideas about 'race' and also to blend analysis of the hardships faced by women and blacks into a single integrated picture centering on the figure of the black working-class woman. The book's combination of historical and feminist scholarship is characteristic of Jones's career. Upon winning a MacArthur fellowship Jones noted that finishing her Bancroft-winning volume inspired her to write her third book, The Dispossessed, America's Underclasses from the Civil War to the Present, which examines poverty in America across the boundaries of race and gender. That book would go on to win her a Choice Award for Outstanding Academic Title in 1992 as well as finalist standing for the Lillian Smith Award for non-fiction. In 2001, Jones published Creek Walking, a memoir of her childhood in Delaware during the 1950s. Although her expertise is primarily in African American history, Jones's books range widely in their coverage, from the effect of economic policies on workers' lives to American educational history. Her understanding of women's history has gained her recognition outside her own field among feminist circles, and she continues to reach non-academic audiences with the expansion of her areas of research. American Work: Four Centuries of Black and White Labor was a History Book Club Selection and in 2002 she was named a fellow in the American Academy of Arts and Sciences. Jones has reflected in an interview that her work involves "writing about issues of race and class and how the United States has changed over the years, how different groups have viewed each other and interacted, how certain groups have been assigned certain kinds of work." Her history writing increasingly features case studies focusing on the overlooked but nonetheless exemplary lives of individuals. Her most recent book, A Dreadful Deceit: The Myth of Race From the Colonial Era to Obama’s America, was published in 2013.

When asked by Politico Magazine to weigh in on which historical figures Donald Trump was comparable to, Jones said he echoed the comments of past Mississippi Governor James K. Vardaman.

Publications

See also 
 Feminist economics
 List of feminist economists

References

External links

1948 births
Living people
Feminist economists
University of Wisconsin–Madison alumni
Brandeis University faculty
MacArthur Fellows
People from Delaware
Wellesley College faculty
Brown University faculty
Feminist historians
Historians of the American Civil War
Historians of the Southern United States
Historians of race relations
Labor historians
Bancroft Prize winners
Presidents of the American Historical Association